Dysthaeta naevia is a species of beetle in the family Cerambycidae. It was described by Olliff in 1888. It is known from Australia.

References

Epicastini
Beetles described in 1888